Luma Pictures is a visual effects studio with facilities in Santa Monica, California and Melbourne, Victoria. Founded in 2002 by Payam Shohadai and Jonathan R. Beutel, the company is best known for their creatures, environments, and effects.

History
The company debuted in 2002 with 65 visual effects shots for Charlie's Angels: Full Throttle, and since then it has completed visual effects on over 70 films, including Thor: The Dark World, Prisoners, Iron Man 3, Oz the Great and Powerful, Captain America: The First Avenger, X-Men: First Class, Underworld for which it was the lead VFX provider for Underworld: Evolution.  Additionally, they have worked with the Coen Brothers on four films, including No Country for Old Men and True Grit. In 2012, the company opened a studio in Melbourne, Australia and currently employs as many as 200 artists worldwide.

Filmography

References

External links

Special effects companies
Visual effects companies
Companies based in Los Angeles